Arkansaw (sometimes misspelled Arkansas) is an unincorporated community in Hardy County, West Virginia, United States. It is located on Arkansaw Road (County Route 3/2) off West Virginia Route 29.

References

Unincorporated communities in Hardy County, West Virginia
Unincorporated communities in West Virginia